Rüppell's bat (Vansonia rueppellii), also known as Rüppell's pipistrelle, is a species of vesper bat found in Africa and Asian republics such as Iraq and Israel. It is the only member of the genus Vansonia. It is found in dry and moist savanna, subtropical or tropical dry shrubland, and hot deserts.

Taxonomy 
It was formerly classified in the genus Pipistrellus, as its most basal member, but phylogenetic evidence supports it forming the separate genus Vansonia. Senegalese specimens of Vansonia rueppellii can be confidently assigned to V. r. senegalensis, which is distributed from Algeria to Senegal. After testing the influence of phylogeny, V. rueppellii was found to be basal to the Pipistrellus/Nyctalus clade.

Description
It weighs only .

Habitat
It is not unusual to find them in crevices, rocks and buildings of various kinds.

References

Vesper bats
Mammals described in 1829
Taxa named by Johann Baptist Fischer
Taxonomy articles created by Polbot
Bats of Asia
Bats of Africa
Taxobox binomials not recognized by IUCN